Alan Levy (10 February 1932 – 2 April 2004) was an American author.

Life
Alan Levy was born in New York City in 1932 and educated at Brown and Columbia universities. In 1952 at Brown, he co-wrote an original Brownbrokers musical titled  Anything Can Be Fixed with Gill Bach and Porter Woods.  In addition, he worked seven years as a reporter for the Louisville Courier-Journal in Kentucky.  Later on, he spent seven years in New York as journalist writing for Life magazine, The Saturday Evening Post, The New York Times and others.  Among first personalities he interviewed were W. H. Auden, the Beatles, Fidel Castro, Graham Greene, Václav Havel, Sophia Loren, Vladimir Nabokov, Richard Nixon and Ezra Pound.

In 1967, Alan Levy moved to Prague with his family, to collaborate on an American version of a musical by Jiří Šlitr and Jiří Suchý.

Shortly after, he covered the Prague Spring and the Soviet-led Warsaw Pact invasion of Czechoslovakia in 1968 and chronicled the events in Rowboat to Prague, published in the United States in 1972. Josef and Zdena Skvoreckys' Toronto publishing house, 68 Publishers, translated the book into Czech in 1975, which has been smuggled to Czechoslovakia, where it became one of the underground classics. It was republished in 1980 as So Many Heroes and translated into numerous languages.

He and his family were expelled from the city in 1971.  They settled in Vienna, Austria, where Alan Levy wrote for the International Herald Tribune, Life, Good Housekeeping, The New York Times Magazine, Cosmopolitan and others. He was also dramaturge of Vienna's English Theatre and taught literature, writing, journalism and drama.

They returned to Prague in 1990, after the so-called "Velvet Revolution".  From 1991 on to his death in 2004, he was editor-in-chief of The Prague Post. Levy claims to have coined the phrase "Prague, the Left Bank of the '90s" in the Post's first issue. The article is said to have attracted thousands of young North Americans to Prague of the 1990s. Other sources, however, say that the phrase was already in common usage before Levy quoted it.

In 1993 he published The Wiesenthal File, the story of Nazi hunter Simon Wiesenthal. The book earned Levy the Author of the Year award from the American Society of Journalists and Authors. Levy also wrote a play, The World of Ruth Draper, and wrote the libretto for Just an Accident?, a symphonic requiem by Austrian composer René Staar, performed in November 1998 in Prague by the Czech National Symphony Orchestra at Dvořák Hall in the Rudolfinum.

With his wife Valerie, he had two daughters Erika and Monica, and four grandchildren, David, Maya, Melina, and Lisa.

Remembering Alan Levy
Alan Levy chose to become active in our country during what was for us a very sensitive and important period -- the time of creating a free, open environment for the media. Because of his human qualities and professional experience, he quickly became recognized as a not inconsiderable figure for whom I had great respect. What is more, I regret him leaving us at a point when a number of Czech media outlets are blurring the limits between serious and tabloid journalism.
Václav Havel, former President of the Czech Republic

Quotes
 "I dreamed only of seeing Prague again before I died. Isolated in Austria by an Iron Curtain ... I nonetheless had a premonition that somehow I would die here. It never dawned on me until soon after 1989's Velvet Revolution that first I could live here."
 "The miracle of my life is to awaken every morning in the 21st century – in Prague."
 "We are living in the Left Bank of the '90s. For some of us, Prague is Second Chance City; for others a new frontier where anything goes, everything goes, and, often enough, nothing works. Yesterday is long gone, today is nebulous, and who knows about tomorrow, but, somewhere within each of us, we all know that we are living in a historic place at a historic time."–in The Prague Post, October 1, 1991 (first issue)
 "A rex-pat is a returning expatriate, an ex-pat has been here, goes home to America, takes a job, maybe goes to law school, maybe does well in America but can't get Prague out of his or her blood and returns to Prague to live again."–in the film Rex-patriates, 2004

Bibliography
(a selection of the 18 books)
 The Wiesenthal File, Alan Levy, William Eerdmans Publishing, Michigan, 1993  
 Vladimir Nabokov: The Velvet Butterfly, Alan Levy, Permanent Press, Sag Harbor, NY, 1984   (pbk.) 
 W.H. Auden: In the Autumn of the Age of Anxiety, Alan Levy, Sag Harbor, NY, 1983   (pbk.)
 Ezra Pound, the Voice of Silence, Alan Levy, Sag Harbor, NY, 1983   (pbk.) 
 Rowboat to Prague, Alan Levy, Grossman Publishers, NY, 1972

External links
 Top Post editor Levy dies at age 72 – by Mark Nessmith, The Prague Post, April 8, 2004
 Alan Levy – A Personal Reflection – by Lisa L. Frankenberg, The Prague Post, April 8, 2004

1932 births
2004 deaths
Brown University alumni
Columbia University alumni
American expatriates in the Czech Republic
Courier Journal people
20th-century American male writers